Epipompilus is a genus of spider wasps in the subfamily Pepsinae, part of the widespread family Pompilidae. Representatives of Epipompilus can be found in Australasia and North and South America. This distribution may indicate that Epipompilus evolved in Gondwana and is similar to other Gondwanan taxa such as the southern beech Nothofagus and Auracaria.

Epipompilus is found in North and South America, ranging from Argentina to extreme southern United States, with around a dozen known species. One species, E. insularis is endemic to New Zealand. In Australia, the genus reaches its greatest diversity, with a greater number of species and a more varied spectrum of morphological features than among the American species. The Epipompilus species in New Guinea are notably brilliantly coloured and apparently highly evolved species. The genus is restricted to these areas but several Tertiary fossils from the northern hemisphere should probably be placed in Epipompilus.

Ecology and behaviour
These wasps are scarce in collections, probably due to their small size and the fact that they rarely visit flowers. A single male E. turneri which was collected on Leptospermum in New South Wales is one of the few flower records. In Australia observation and collection have often been associated with the trunks of living Eucalyptus trees. The morphology of many of the species suggests that they are adapted for crawling under bark and for entering crevices to search for spiders. Prey recorded includes spiders from the family Sparassidae. These wasps probably do not build nests but hunt spiders underneath bark and lay eggs on them as they find them. Taken into consideration with the many primitive structural features of members of this genus, it is suggestive that the hunting technique of Epipompilus represents an ancestral type of behaviour for spider wasps.

One of three new species identified in 2020, based on a single specimen seen in 2018, E. namadji, is named after the Namadgi National Park in the Australian Capital Territory, in which it was found. Efforts are ongoing by teams from the Australian National Insect Collection at the CSIRO to find more of the wasps, after nearly 80 per cent of the national park was lost in the 2019–20 Australian bushfire season.

Species
The following species have been assigned to Epipompilus:

Epipompilus albofasciatus Evans, 1972
Epipompilus aztecus Cresson, 1869
Epipompilus caeruleus Evans, 1972
Epipompilus cardaleae Evans, 1972
Epipompilus compactus Evans, 1972
Epipompilus delicatus Turner, 1910
Epipompilus depressus Evans, 1962
Epipompilus excelsus Bradley, 1944
Epipompilus exleyae Evans, 1972
Epipompilus formosus Evans, 1972
Epipompilus gilesi Turner, 1910
Epipompilus hackeri Evans, 1972
Epipompilus inca Evans, 1968
Epipompilus incompletus Evans, 1972
Epipompilus insularis Kohl, 1884
Epipompilus jocosus Evans, 1968
Epipompilus matthewsi Evans, 1972
Epipompilus mirabundus Yuan & Rodriguez, 2020
Epipompilus montivagus Evans, 1972
Epipompilus multifasciatus Evans, 1972
Epipompilus namadji Yuan & Rodriguez, 2020
Epipompilus neboissi Evans, 1972
Epipompilus nigribasis Banks, 1925
Epipompilus pallidus Evans, 1962
Epipompilus papuensis Evans, 1972
Epipompilus pauper Evans, 1972
Epipompilus pictipennis Evans, 1962
Epipompilus pulcherrimus Evans, 1955
Epipompilus rieki Evans, 1972
Epipompilus submetallicus Evans, 1972
Epipompilus taree Yuan & Rodriguez, 2020
Epipompilus tasmanicus Evans, 1972
Epipompilus tucumanus Evans, 1968
Epipompilus turneri Evans, 1962
Epipompilus variegatus Evans, 1972

References

Hymenoptera genera
Pepsinae